Inmortal Tour is a reunion world tour by the bachata group Aventura. The name of the tour references their reunion hit and lead single by the main singer Romeo Santos, "Inmortal". It was their first tour in 10 years since The Last Tour and their first reunion concerts since the 2016 concerts in the United Palace.

The tour was commercially successful and sold out in just minutes. Initially only seven dates were announced but due to high demand more shows were added. The first 14 shows in the United States earned US$23.1 million from 176,931 tickets sold and Billboard predicted that the North American leg could reach $50 million in ticket sales.

On March 12, 2020, the group announced via their social networks that they had to postpone their second concert in Miami and stated "After the recent announcement from the Miami mayor, Aventura's sold-out concert tonight at American Airlines was postponed. After that, they decided to postpone their concerts to July and August. However, all remaining concerts were cancelled due the COVID-19 pandemic.

In 2021, the group had announced that they would return on tour. However, instead of doing the shows at the originally planned venues, they decided to perform five stadium shows to complete their tour in the United States. Only four were done as for some unknown reason they had cancelled one of them. In December 2021, they had their last two concerts together at the Félix Sánchez Olympic Stadium in Santo Domingo, Dominican Republic.

Background 
On April 5, 2019, the band reunited and released the track "Inmortal" by surprise as a lead single of Santos' fourth studio album Utopía. It was their first song together in 10 years. On September 21, 2019, Santos performed a concert at the Metlife Stadium to promote the album where Aventura were invited. The concert broke attendance records with 80,000 tickets sold. On December 9, 2019, the band announced their first U.S. tour in 10 years. Initial plans were for seven shows in seven different cities. However, due to the high demand for tickets, more shows and cities were added.

Tour dates

Cancelled shows 

 Some of these dates may not be the original dates as some shows were at first postpone until it was later announced that it was canceled which then made changes to their 2021 tour.

Stadium Tour dates
When all the shows from 2020 got canceled, Aventura decided to make a few show at stadiums to finish their reunion tour. It was even renamed as the Inmortal Stadium Tour.

Cancelled Shows

 Originally it was scheduled for August 22, 2021. However, it was postpone and later cancelled with no explanation given.

References 

Concert tours cancelled due to the COVID-19 pandemic
2020 concert tours
Aventura (band)